Norwood is an unincorporated community in Washington County, Oregon, United States. It is North and South of Tualatin, Oregon and North of Wilsonville, Oregon.

References

Unincorporated communities in Washington County, Oregon
Unincorporated communities in Oregon